Dietmar "Didi" Schacht (born 28 September 1962) is a German football coach and former player who most recently was in charge of SV Straelen.

Playing career
Schacht was born in Duisburg. He made 22 appearances in the Bundesliga and 228 in the 2. Bundesliga during his playing career.

Managerial career
On 1 July 2015, Schacht was appointed head coach and sports director at Hamborn 07.

References

External links
 
 

1962 births
Living people
Footballers from Duisburg
German footballers
Association football defenders
Bundesliga players
2. Bundesliga players
K League 1 players
MSV Duisburg players
Pohang Steelers players
Tennis Borussia Berlin players
Arminia Bielefeld players
Alemannia Aachen players
FC Schalke 04 players
German football managers
1. FC Kaan-Marienborn managers
German expatriate footballers
German expatriate sportspeople in South Korea
Expatriate footballers in South Korea